Gogoladze is a Georgian surname that may refer to:

 Leri Gogoladze (born 1938), Georgian water polo player
 Kakha Gogoladze (born 1968 ), Georgian and Turkmen footballer
Chatuna Gogaladze (born 1970), Georgian politician
 Koba Gogoladze (born 1972), Georgian boxer
 Ucha Gogoladze (born 1990), Georgian footballer

Georgian-language surnames
Surnames of Georgian origin